{{Infobox company
| name = KCB Bank Kenya Limited
| logo = KCB Bank Kenya Limited logo.png
| image = Kencom house.jpg
| image_caption = KCB Bank Moi Avenue Branch
| type = Sbsidiary of KCB Group
| industry = Banking
| foundation = 2015
| num_locations = 207 Branches, 399 ATMs, 12,724 Agents, 8023 merchant outlets
|num_locations_year = 2020
|rating = B2 negative (2020)(Moodys Investor Service)
| location = Kencom House, Moi Avenue, Nairobi, Kenya and KCB Plaza, Upperhill, Nairobi, Kenya
| key_people = Lawrence NjiruChairmanPaul RussoChief Executive Officer
 Eng. Stanley Kamau - Alternate to CS Treasury
 Tom Ipomai
 Simeon Rono
 Njeri Onyango
 Caroline Rabar Okonga
 Joseph Muigai
 Anne Eriksson
 Eunice Nyala
 Samuel makome
 Bonnie Okumu
| products = Loans, credit cards, savings, investments, mortgages, Insurance
| revenue = : Aftertax: US$166.3 million (KES:18.3 billion) (2020)
| assets = US$6.9 Billion+ (KES:758.3 billion) (2020)
| num_employees = 4901 
| parent = KCB Group
| homepage = 
}}KCB Bank Kenya Limited is a financial services provider headquartered in Nairobi, Kenya. It is licensed as a commercial bank, by the Central Bank of Kenya, the national banking regulator. The bank has also been running Agency banking model.

 Overview 
As of December 2015, KCB Bank Kenya was the largest commercial bank in Kenya with assets of more than US$3.681 billion (KES:366 billion) and US$2.776 billion (KES:276 billion) in customer deposits.
y August 2021, the bank recorded a customer deposit growth to USD$5.47 billion (KES:601.7 billion) and had an asset base value of USD$7.09 billion (KES:7.09 billion).During that time, it had 201 branches, 397 ATM machines, and registered 15,273 Agents and Merchant outlets spread across Kenya.

KCB Bank Kenya received both Kenya’s Best Bank 2021 award and Africa’s Best Responsible Bank in the Euromoney Awards for Excellence.[ ] The bank was feted as the Best Bank in Customer Experience in Kenya and the Most Innovative Banking Brand in Kenya by thee 2021 Global Brands Magazine Awards.

 History 
KCB Bank Kenya roots trace back to July 1896 when its parent company, KCB Group, was formed as a branch of the National Bank of India in Mombasa. In 1958, Grindlays Bank merged with the National Bank of India to form the National and Grindlays Bank. Upon independence, the Government of Kenya acquired 60% shareholding in National & Grindlays Bank. In 1970, the Government took full control of the bank and renamed it to Kenya Commercial Bank Group.

KCB Bank Kenya, as it is now known, was incorporated in 2015 as a result of the corporate restructure of Kenya Commercial Bank Group (KCB Group). Prior to 2015, KCB Group was both a licensed bank and a holding company for its subsidiaries. This was in compliance with the Kenya Finance Act No.57 of 2012. KCB Group Limited announced, in April 2015, its intention to incorporate a new wholly owned subsidiary, KCB Bank Kenya Limited, to which it would transfer its Kenyan banking business, assets and liabilities. The re-organisation converted KCB Group Limited into a non-trading holding company that owns both banking and non-banking subsidiary companies.

In 2016, KCB Group PLC was registered as a non-operating holding company to manage and oversee all KCB regional units in Kenya, Tanzania, South Sudan, Uganda, Rwanda, Burundi and Ethiopia.  In 2019, KCB Group PLC acquired National Bank of Kenya.

 Ownership 
KCB Bank Kenya Limited is a 100 percent subsidiary of KCB Group. Shares of KCB Group are listed on the Nairobi Stock Exchange (NSE), under the symbol (KCB). The group's stock is also cross listed on the Uganda Securities Exchange (USE), the Rwanda Stock Exchange (RSE) and the Dar es Salaam Stock Exchange (DSE).

KCB Group Plc

KCB Bank Kenya Limited is a member of the KCB Group of companies. KCB Group companies include:
 KCB Bank Kenya Limited''' – Nairobi, Kenya
 National Bank of Kenya – Nairobi, Kenya
 KCB Bank Burundi Limited – Bujumbura, Burundi
 KCB Bank Rwanda Limited – Kigali, Rwanda
 KCB Bank South Sudan Limited – Juba, South Sudan
 KCB Bank Tanzania Limited – Dar es Salaam, Tanzania
 KCB Bank Uganda Limited – Kampala, Uganda
 KCB Foundation Limited
 KCB Capital Limited
 KCB Insurance Agency Limited
 KCB Sports Sponsorship Limited – Nairobi, Kenya

Branch network
As of August 2021, KCB Group had a total of 354 branches, 1,103 ATM machines, and 15,273 bank agents and merchant outlets throughout all of its subsidiaries. It has the largest number of own-branded ATMs in Kenya. At that time, the Group served a footprint of 26.8 million customers marking it the largest in the region.

Officers and management
The chairman of the bank's board of directors is Andrew Wambari Kairu, and the chief executive officer and managing director of the bank is Paul Russo.

See also

References

External links
 Website of KCB Bank Kenya Limited

Banks of Kenya
Companies based in Nairobi
Banks established in 2015
Kenyan brands
KCB Group
Kenyan companies established in 2015

ca:Kenya Commercial Bank